The Crown Council of Belgium is composed of the King of the Belgians, the Ministers and the Ministers of State (mostly former ministers and other major politicians). The constitutional Monarch chairs the Crown Council, which has no legal competence but simply advises the crown when consulted on extraordinary matters.

Working 
During a session of the Crown Council, the Ministers of State can do nothing but advise the King, as the authority to make political decisions is vested in the King and the Federal Government, in accordance with the Belgian Constitution.

To date, the Crown Council has met on only five occasions:

Current use 
Nowadays, the Crown Council is seen as an old-fashioned or even outdated political organ. The title of Minister of State is given as an honorary title, with no view to any possible Crown Council meeting. None of the living Ministers of State have ever participated in a Crown Council session. During the 2007–08 Belgian government formation though, King Albert II formally asked the help of several Ministers of State with experience in solving political crises. The King consulted Ministers of State Wilfried Martens, Jean-Luc Dehaene, Guy Verhofstadt, Philippe Moureaux, Willy Claes, Gérard Deprez, Jos Geysels, Philippe Busquin, Charles-Ferdinand Nothomb, José Daras, Raymond Langendries, Herman De Croo, Louis Michel, Herman Van Rompuy and Armand De Decker. Some political analysts saw this as comparable to the Crown Council. Commonly, Ministers of State are appointed to formal offices is the process of forming a government or to solve a cabinet crisis.

References

Further reading 
 André Molitor, La Fonction Royale en Belgique, CRISP, 1979

Council
Crown Council of Belgium
Belgium